Let's Go, Gallagher is a 1925 American silent Western film directed by Robert De Lacey and starring Tom Tyler, Barbara Starr, and Olin Francis.

Plot
As described in a film magazine review, Tom Gallagher, cowboy, wanders into a saloon and gets into a fight, as a result of which he is chased by a sheriff’s posse. He pauses in his flight long enough to rescue Little Joey, a small boy, and a dog from under the wheels of a train and the posse catches him. However, he is released and goes to work on the Bar M ranch owned by Dorothy Manning. Dorothy’s ranch hands are mismanaging things and her foreman, Black Carter, and another man are rustling her cattle. She makes Tom her foreman. The others resent this, especially Black Carter, who is in love with Dorothy and has told her that things will go better if she responds to his advances. Black Carter and Thug ambush Tom and Dorothy and Tom saves the young woman from death. Tom goes away to try to get money to clear the mortgage that Perkins holds on the ranch, and while he is gone Black Carter and Thug kidnap Dorothy. Then Tom is captured and tied up. He escapes, however, and reaches the ranch with the money ahead of Black Carter. Then oil is found on the ranch and all ends well.

Cast 
 Tom Tyler as Tom Gallagher 
 Barbara Starr as Dorothy Manning 
 Olin Francis as Black Carter 
 Sam Peterson as Thug Peters 
 Alfred Hewston as Bendy Mulligan 
 Frankie Darro as Little Joey

References

External links
±
 

1925 films
1925 Western (genre) films
Films directed by Robert De Lacey
American black-and-white films
Film Booking Offices of America films
Silent American Western (genre) films
1920s English-language films
1920s American films